Zhejiang Qianjiang Motorcycle Group Co., usually known as Qianjiang Motorcycle, is a Chinese motorcycle manufacturer founded in 1985 with registered office in Winling (Zhejiang province). It is now one of the largest manufacturer of 2 wheeled vehicles in China. Qianjiang is a US$460 Million state holding enterprise with a 5 domestic subsidiaries, 10 branches, 1 overseas subsidiary and over 10,000 employees.

The vehicles are sold under four brands: QJiang, QJMotor, Benelli, Keeway Motors and KSR Moto.

 QJMotor and QJiang are two brands used to market the entire range of products in China, which includes motorcycles and scooters.
 Benelli is the Italian historic motorcycle manufacturer, acquired in 2005.
 Keeway Motors is the brand used for exports to Asia, Europe and South America.
 KSR Moto models are produced for the Austrian KSR Group and are badge-engineered versions of QJmotor vehicles.

Since 1999 it has been marketing its models on foreign markets under the Keeway Motors brand. In 2006, the company won the motorcycle industry award as exporter of the year; in fact about 20% of the production is sold abroad. The company, which has a capital of more than 750 million dollars, has been listed on the Shenzhen Stock Exchange since 1999.

In 2005, Qianjiang acquired Benelli, a historic Italian motorcycle manufacturer based in Pesaro in the Marche region.

Since September 2016, the majority shareholding (29.8%) of the company has been controlled by the Chinese giant Geely Holding Group.

Sponsorship
In 2022, QJMotor became the main sponsor of Avintia Esponsorama Racing in the Moto3 class with its two riders, Matteo Bertelle and Elia Bartolini.  Then from the 2023, season, QJmotor became the main sponsor of Gresini Racing in the Moto2 championship.

References

External links
 

Motorcycle manufacturers of China
Vehicle manufacturing companies established in 1985
Companies based in Zhejiang
Chinese brands
Geely divisions and subsidiaries
Chinese companies established in 1985